Kalyanam Raghuramaiah (1901–1975), popularly known as Eelapata Raghuramaiah, was an Indian actor, and thespian known for his works in Telugu cinema, and Telugu theatre. A recipient of the Sangeet Natak Akademi Award, and the Padmashri, He was known for the roles of Krishna or Dushyantha, Bhavanisankar, Narada etc. He performed those roles for about 60 years. He indulged in elaborate raga alapana, based on different ragas while rendering padyams.

One of the finest method actors, he had the ability to sing padyams and songs through whistle, by putting his finger in mouth and producing the whistle or flute sound (meaning Eela in Telugu). He has acted in various dramas and gave more than 20,000 stage performances. He was called the "Nightingale of the Stage" by Rabindranath Tagore.

Early life
He was born in Suddapalli village of Guntur district and named as Venkata Subbaiah. He was popular during childhood days in playing Raghurama, hence named as Raghuramaiah by Kasinadhuni Nageswara Rao.

Early career
He entered Telugu cinema in 1933 in the film "Prudhvi Putra". It is the fifth talkie film in Telugu cinema industry. This is the 1st Telugu movie produced by Telugu person viz. Pothina Srinivasa Rao. He acted as Krishna in many films including Sri Krishna Rayabaram (1960) and in the film Chintamani.

Personal life
He married Savitri, second daughter of Rohini Venkata Subbaiah and Sitamma in 1938 at Bapatla.  She inaugurated the statue of her husband Raghuramaiah at Chebrolu, Guntur district on 5 March 2013.  At the age of 92 years i.e. on 8 December 2014 she died due to old age at Vijayawada. They have only one daughter viz. Thota Satyavathi, Son-in-law Thota Parvateeswara Rao.

Their grand children are Dr. T.V.S. Gopal, Chintala Ratna, and Gangisetty Raja.  His brother-in-law Rohini Venkaiah, Commercial Tax Officer (Retd.) and his wife Dr. Rohini Venkata Sundara Varada Rajeswari, Famous Devotional Writer of several books and Member Sree Hampi Virupaksha Vidyaranya Maha Samsthanam and their son Rohini Mahesh, Devotional Writer of several articles and Member Sree Hampi Virupaksha Vidyaranya Maha Samsthanam date of birth and his son Rohini Harish date of birth and Raghramaiah's date of death is same i.e. 24 February. He toured Malaysia, Japan, Hong Kong and Singapore with a drama troupe in 1972.

Death and popularity
He died of a heart attack in 1975 at the age of 75 years.  He was called the "Nightingale of the Stage" by Rabindranath Tagore. A well sheltered bronze statue of him was installed in his honor at Suddapalli village, his birthplace, on 14 February 2014 by his Eldest brother's son Sri. Kalyanam Narasimha Rao, Retd. Senior Manager, Hindustan Aeronautics Limited, Hyderabad and the statue was inaugurated by Sri. Mandali Budda Prasad, Chairman Official Languages, Andhra Pradesh.

Filmography

 Pruthvi Putra (1933)
 Bhakta Kuchela (1935)
 Lanka Dahanam (1936)
 Rukmini Kalyanam (1937)
 Pasupathastram (1939)
 Apavadu (1941)
 Talliprema (1941)
 Gollabhama (1947) 
 Madalasa (1948)
 Maya Rambha (1950)
 Mayapilla (1951)
 Prapancham (1953)
 Sati Sakkubai (1954) as Lord Krishna
 Sri Krishna Tulabharam (1955/I) as Sri Krishna
 Chintamani (1956)
 Sri Krishna Maya (1958)
 Sri Krishna Rayabaram (1960)
 Nagarjuna (1961/I)
 Usha Parinayam (1961) as Lord Krishna
 Dakshayagnam (1962/I) as Narada
 Valmiki (1963/I)
 Somavara Vratha Mahatyam (1963)
 Mohini Bhasmasura (1966)
 Sri Sri Sri Maryada Ramanna (1967)

Awards
National Honors
 Sangeet Natak Akademi Award in 1973

Civilian Honors
He was awarded Padmashri by Government of India in 1975.

References

Telugu male actors
Andhra University alumni
Recipients of the Padma Shri in arts
Recipients of the Sangeet Natak Akademi Award
People from Guntur district
Indian male film actors
Indian male stage actors
Male actors in Tamil cinema
Male actors from Andhra Pradesh
1901 births
1975 deaths
Male actors in Telugu theatre
20th-century Indian male actors